The Light of the World is a 2003 slideshow film by Jack T. Chick depicting events from the Bible through 360 oil paintings by Fred Carter.

Plot

Credits
 Narrator: David Jeremiah 
 Music: John Campbell

External links
 Information at Chick Publications website
 

2003 drama films
2003 films
2003 direct-to-video films
Cultural depictions of Adam and Eve
Cultural depictions of Cain and Abel
Cultural depictions of Judas Iscariot
Cultural depictions of John the Baptist
Cultural depictions of Moses
Demons in film
The Devil in film
Films about angels
Films about Catholicism
Films about Christianity
Films about evangelicalism
Films set in heaven
Films set in hell
Portrayals of Jesus in film
Films about Satanism
2000s English-language films